Nils-Olav Johansen (born 12 April 1966 in Bjugn, Norway) is a major Norwegian entertainer and jazz musician (guitar and vocals), known from several recordings and as orchestra leader. He is with Jarle Vespestad (drums) and Stian Carstensen (many instruments), central members of the Balkan-jazz orchestra Farmers Market.

Johansen is from Sør-Trøndelag, where he eventually moved to Heimdal. His father was a sailor, and he had an early contact with Hawaiian music. This influence, from the floating string sound, has followed him throughout his musical career.

Career
He was a graduate of jazz studies at Trøndelag Conservatory of Music 1986–88. In Trondheim, he joined several groups that arose out of student life at NTNU, such as Close Enough (1987–88) and the Pentateuch (from 1989, later called Blix Band). Since 1992, he has been a regular member of three major orchestras: Farmers Market, Frode Fjellheims Jazz Joik Ensemble and "Storytellers", and has also had guest appearances with numerous other bands, such as "Veslefrekk", "Embla", Trondheim Jazz Orchestra and with Ståle Storløkken. Since 1991 he has contributed to dozens of recordings, with among others Farmers Market, Blix Band, "TINGeLING" (Tinkerbell), "Dingobats", Transjoik (here also as a composer and producer), "Køhn/Johansen Sextet", Trondheim Jazz Orchestra, "The Core".

He has led his own trio with Harald Johnsen (bass) and Sverre Gjørvad (percussion). Johansen has been a guest professor at the Royal Academy of Music in Aarhus, at the request of Django Bates. His distinctive vocals and guitar playing, ever with elements from the Finnish and Eastern European folk music, make Johansen an easily recognizable artist.

Johansen has been, along with Stian Carstensen, one of the profiles in the band Farmers Market. It impresses him with virtuosity and humor. He made notable by its collaboration with Sigurd Køhn in Køhn/Johansen Sextet, a collaboration that ended in 2004, when the tsunami struck Thailand, where Køhn was on vacation. In 2005, he became a permanent member of the Anglo-Norwegian band Food.

In spring 2012, Johansen vent to India and the Jazz Utsav-festival with his own quartet put together for the occasion. It is a band consisting of the drummer Thomas Strønen, bassist Ole Morten Vågan and saxophonist Knut Riisnæs in addition to Johansen.

Discography

Solo albums 
My Deal (2007, Jazzaway), with: Andreas Bye, Mats Eilertsen and Reidar Skår)

Collaborative works 
With Køhn/Johansen Sextet
Woman's Got to Have It (1999, Real), with Sigurd Køhn, Roy Powell, Harald Johnsen, Erlend Gjerde & Jarle Vespestad
Angels (1999, Real), with Sigurd Køhn, Roy Powell, Harald Johnsen, Ole Johan Myklebust, Jørgen Munkeby and Jarle Vespestad +  Even Skatrud Andersen, Hallgrim Berg, Heine Totland, Torbjørn A. Raae, and others)

With Farmers Market (Stian Carstensen, Trifon Trifonov, Finn Guttormsen & Jarle Vespestad)
Speed/Balkan/Boogie (1995, Kirkelig Kulturverksted)
Musikk fra Hybridene (Music From The Hybrides) (1997, Kirkelig Kulturverksted)
2000: Farmers Market (Winter & Winter)
2008: Surfin' USSR (Ipecac/Tuba)
2012: Slav to the Rhythm (Division)

With Frode Fjellheims Jazz Joik Ensemble
1994: Saajve dans
Under the name Transjoik
2004: Uja nami
2005: Bewafá

With Storytellers
1994: Enjoy Storytellers (Curling Legs)

With Blix Band
1989: Big Bambus (1989/2001)
1996: På en lyserød sky
1997: Pinseria (1997/2010)
1998: Texas

With Håvard Lund
1995: Letters

With Niels Præstholm & Embla Nordic Project in København
1997: Imagic

With Eldbjørg Raknes' TINGeLING
1997: TINGeLING
2002: So much depends upon a red wheel barrow, commissioned to Vossajazz (Platearbeiderne)
2006: I live suddenly (My Recordings)

With Jon Balke
1998: Saturation

With Solveig Slettahjell
2001: Slow motion orchestra

With Christina Bjordal
2003: Where dreams begin
2009: Warrior of light

Within Børre Dalhaug's "Bigbandblast"
2004: Bigbandblast! (Real Records)

With Eirik Hegdal
2004: Within Trondheim Jazz Orchestra

With The Core
2005: The Core

With Trondheim Jazz Orchestra
2008: Wood and water
2009: What if

References

External links 
Farmers Market Website
Johansen, Nils Olav – Biography in Ballade (in Norwegian)

1966 births
20th-century Norwegian guitarists
21st-century Norwegian guitarists
20th-century Norwegian male singers
20th-century Norwegian singers
21st-century Norwegian male singers
21st-century Norwegian singers
Norwegian jazz guitarists
Norwegian jazz singers
Norwegian University of Science and Technology alumni
Musicians from Bjugn
Living people
20th-century guitarists
Farmers Market (band) members
Trondheim Jazz Orchestra members
Storytellers (Norwegian band) members
TINGeLING members